This article serves as an index - as complete as possible - of all the honorific orders or similar decorations received by the British royal family, classified by continent, awarding country and recipient.

National honours

United Kingdom 
 King Charles III:
 Sovereign (and former Royal Knight Companion) of the Most Noble Order of the Garter
 Sovereign (and former Extra Knight) of the Most Ancient and Most Noble Order of the Thistle
 Sovereign of the Most Illustrious Order of Saint Patrick
 Sovereign (and former Great Master and First and Principal Knight Grand Cross) of the Most Honourable Order of the Bath
 Sovereign (and former Member) of the Order of Merit
 Sovereign of the Most Exalted Order of the Star of India
 Sovereign of the Most Distinguished Order of Saint Michael and Saint George
 Sovereign of the Most Eminent Order of the Indian Empire
 Sovereign of the Royal Victorian Order
 Sovereign of the Most Excellent Order of the British Empire
 Sovereign of the Order of the Companions of Honour
 Sovereign Head of the Most Venerable Order of the Hospital of Saint John of Jerusalem
 Sovereign of the Imperial Order of the Crown of India
 Sovereign of the Distinguished Service Order
 Sovereign of the Imperial Service Order
 Sovereign of the Order of British India
 Sovereign of the Indian Order of Merit
 Sovereign of the Order of Burma
 Recipient of the Long Service and Good Conduct Medal
 Recipient of the Queen Elizabeth II Coronation Medal
 Recipient of the Queen Elizabeth II Silver Jubilee Medal
 Recipient of the Queen Elizabeth II Golden Jubilee Medal
 Recipient of the Queen Elizabeth II Diamond Jubilee Medal
 Recipient of the Queen Elizabeth II Platinum Jubilee Medal
 Queen Camilla:
 Royal Lady of the Most Noble Order of the Garter
 Dame Grand Cross of the Royal Victorian Order
 Member of the Royal Family Order of Queen Elizabeth II
 Recipient of the Queen Elizabeth II Diamond Jubilee Medal
 Recipient of the Queen Elizabeth II Platinum Jubilee Medal
Counsellor of State (since 2022)
 William, Prince of Wales:
 Royal Knight Companion of the Most Noble Order of the Garter
 Extra Knight of the Most Ancient and Most Noble Order of the Thistle
 Recipient of the Queen Elizabeth II Golden Jubilee Medal
 Recipient of the Queen Elizabeth II Diamond Jubilee Medal
 Recipient of the Queen Elizabeth II Platinum Jubilee Medal
Counsellor of State (since 2003 [2022])
 Catherine, Princess of Wales:
 Dame Grand Cross of the Royal Victorian Order
 Member of the Royal Family Order of Queen Elizabeth II
 Recipient of the Queen Elizabeth II Diamond Jubilee Medal
 Recipient of the Queen Elizabeth II Platinum Jubilee Medal
 Prince Harry, Duke of Sussex:
 Knight Commander of the Royal Victorian Order
 Recipient of the Afghanistan Operational Service Medal
 Recipient of the Queen Elizabeth II Golden Jubilee Medal
 Recipient of the Queen Elizabeth II Diamond Jubilee Medal
 Recipient of the Queen Elizabeth II Platinum Jubilee Medal
Counsellor of State (since 2005 [2022])
 Meghan, Duchess of Sussex
 Recipient of the Queen Elizabeth II Platinum Jubilee Medal
 Prince Andrew, Duke of York:
 Royal Knight Companion of the Most Noble Order of the Garter
 Knight Grand Cross of the Royal Victorian Order
 Recipient of the South Atlantic Medal, Special Class
 Recipient of the Queen Elizabeth II Silver Jubilee Medal
 Recipient of the Queen Elizabeth II Golden Jubilee Medal
 Recipient of the Queen Elizabeth II Diamond Jubilee Medal
 Recipient of the Queen Elizabeth II Platinum Jubilee Medal
 Recipient of the Naval Long Service and Good Conduct Medal 
Counsellor of State (since 1981 [2022])
 Princess Beatrice, Mrs Edoardo Mapelli Mozzi:
 Recipient of the Queen Elizabeth II Golden Jubilee Medal
 Recipient of the Queen Elizabeth II Diamond Jubilee Medal
 Recipient of the Queen Elizabeth II Platinum Jubilee Medal
 Counsellor of State (since 2022)
 Edoardo Mapelli Mozzi:
 Recipient of the Queen Elizabeth II Platinum Jubilee Medal
 Princess Eugenie, Mrs Jack Brooksbank:
 Recipient of the Queen Elizabeth II Golden Jubilee Medal
 Recipient of the Queen Elizabeth II Diamond Jubilee Medal
 Recipient of the Queen Elizabeth II Platinum Jubilee Medal
 Jack Brooksbank:
 Recipient of the Queen Elizabeth II Platinum Jubilee Medal
 Prince Edward, Duke of Edinburgh:
 Royal Knight Companion of the Most Noble Order of the Garter
 Knight Grand Cross of the Royal Victorian Order
 Recipient of the Queen Elizabeth II Silver Jubilee Medal
 Recipient of the Queen Elizabeth II Golden Jubilee Medal
 Recipient of the Queen Elizabeth II Diamond Jubilee Medal
 Recipient of the Queen Elizabeth II Platinum Jubilee Medal
 Counsellor of State (since 2022)
 Sophie, Duchess of Edinburgh:
 Dame Grand Cross of the Royal Victorian Order
 Dame Grand Cross of the Most Venerable Order of the Hospital of Saint John of Jerusalem
 Member of the Royal Family Order of Queen Elizabeth II
 Recipient of the Order of Saint John Service Medal
 Recipient of the Queen Elizabeth II Golden Jubilee Medal
 Recipient of the Queen Elizabeth II Diamond Jubilee Medal
 Recipient of the Queen Elizabeth II Platinum Jubilee Medal
 Lady Louise Windsor:
 Recipient of the Queen Elizabeth II Diamond Jubilee Medal
 Recipient of the Queen Elizabeth II Platinum Jubilee Medal
 James, Earl of Wessex:
 Recipient of the Queen Elizabeth II Diamond Jubilee Medal
 Recipient of the Queen Elizabeth II Platinum Jubilee Medal
 Princess Anne, Princess Royal:
 Royal Knight Companion of the Most Noble Order of the Garter
 Extra Knight of the Most Ancient and Most Noble Order of the Thistle
 Grand Master and Dame Grand Cross of the Royal Victorian Order
 Dame Grand Cross of the Most Venerable Order of the Hospital of Saint John of Jerusalem
 Member of the Royal Family Order of Queen Elizabeth II
 Recipient of the Queen Elizabeth II Coronation Medal
 Recipient of the Queen Elizabeth II Silver Jubilee Medal
 Recipient of the Queen Elizabeth II Golden Jubilee Medal
 Recipient of the Queen Elizabeth II Diamond Jubilee Medal
 Recipient of the Queen Elizabeth II Platinum Jubilee Medal
 Counsellor of State (since 2022)
 Sir Timothy Laurence:
 Knight Commander of the Royal Victorian Order
 Companion of the Most Honourable Order of the Bath
 Recipient of the General Service Medal
 Recipient of the Queen Elizabeth II Golden Jubilee Medal
 Recipient of the Queen Elizabeth II Diamond Jubilee Medal
 Recipient of the Queen Elizabeth II Platinum Jubilee Medal
 Peter Phillips:
 Recipient of the Queen Elizabeth II Golden Jubilee Medal
 Recipient of the Queen Elizabeth II Diamond Jubilee Medal
 Recipient of the Queen Elizabeth II Platinum Jubilee Medal
 Autumn Phillips:
 Recipient of the Queen Elizabeth II Diamond Jubilee Medal
 Zara Tindall:
 Member of the Most Excellent Order of the British Empire
 Recipient of the Queen Elizabeth II Golden Jubilee Medal
 Recipient of the Queen Elizabeth II Diamond Jubilee Medal
 Recipient of the Queen Elizabeth II Platinum Jubilee Medal
 Mike Tindall:
 Member of the Most Excellent Order of the British Empire
 Recipient of the Queen Elizabeth II Diamond Jubilee Medal
 Recipient of the Queen Elizabeth II Platinum Jubilee Medal
 Prince Richard, Duke of Gloucester:
 Royal Knight Companion of the Most Noble Order of the Garter
 Knight Grand Cross of the Royal Victorian Order
 Grand Prior and Bailiff Grand Cross of the Most Venerable Order of the Hospital of Saint John of Jerusalem
 Recipient of the Order of Saint John Service Medal
 Recipient of the Queen Elizabeth II Coronation Medal
 Recipient of the Queen Elizabeth II Silver Jubilee Medal
 Recipient of the Queen Elizabeth II Golden Jubilee Medal
 Recipient of the Queen Elizabeth II Diamond Jubilee Medal
 Recipient of the Queen Elizabeth II Platinum Jubilee Medal
 Birgitte, Duchess of Gloucester:
 Dame Grand Cross of the Royal Victorian Order
 Dame of Justice of the Most Venerable Order of the Hospital of Saint John of Jerusalem
 Member of the Royal Family Order of Queen Elizabeth II
 Recipient of the Order of Saint John Service Medal
 Recipient of the Queen Elizabeth II Silver Jubilee Medal
 Recipient of the Queen Elizabeth II Golden Jubilee Medal
 Recipient of the Queen Elizabeth II Diamond Jubilee Medal
 Recipient of the Queen Elizabeth II Platinum Jubilee Medal
 Prince Edward, Duke of Kent:
 Royal Knight Companion of the Most Noble Order of the Garter
 Grand Master and Knight Grand Cross of the Most Distinguished Order of Saint Michael and Saint George
 Knight Grand Cross of the Royal Victorian Order
 Recipient of the King George VI Coronation Medal
 Recipient of the Queen Elizabeth II Coronation Medal
 Recipient of the Queen Elizabeth II Silver Jubilee Medal
 Recipient of the Queen Elizabeth II Golden Jubilee Medal
 Recipient of the Queen Elizabeth II Diamond Jubilee Medal
 Recipient of the Queen Elizabeth II Platinum Jubilee Medal
 Katharine, Duchess of Kent:
 Dame Grand Cross of the Royal Victorian Order
 Member of the Royal Family Order of Queen Elizabeth II
 Recipient of the Queen Elizabeth II Silver Jubilee Medal
 Recipient of the Queen Elizabeth II Golden Jubilee Medal
 Recipient of the Queen Elizabeth II Diamond Jubilee Medal
 Recipient of the Queen Elizabeth II Platinum Jubilee Medal
 Prince Michael of Kent:
 Knight Grand Cross of the Royal Victorian Order
 Knight of Justice of the Most Venerable Order of the Hospital of Saint John of Jerusalem
 Recipient of the Queen Elizabeth II Coronation Medal
 Recipient of the Queen Elizabeth II Silver Jubilee Medal
 Recipient of the Queen Elizabeth II Golden Jubilee Medal
 Recipient of the Queen Elizabeth II Diamond Jubilee Medal
 Recipient of the Queen Elizabeth II Platinum Jubilee Medal
 Princess Michael of Kent:
 Recipient of the Queen Elizabeth II Golden Jubilee Medal
 Recipient of the Queen Elizabeth II Diamond Jubilee Medal
 Recipient of the Queen Elizabeth II Platinum Jubilee Medal
 Princess Alexandra, The Honourable Lady Ogilvy:
 Royal Lady Companion of the Most Noble Order of the Garter
 Dame Grand Cross of the Royal Victorian Order
 Member of the Royal Family Order of Queen Elizabeth II
 Member of the Royal Family Order of King George VI
 Recipient of the King George VI Coronation Medal
 Recipient of the Queen Elizabeth II Coronation Medal
 Recipient of the Queen Elizabeth II Silver Jubilee Medal
 Recipient of the Queen Elizabeth II Golden Jubilee Medal
 Recipient of the Queen Elizabeth II Diamond Jubilee Medal
 Recipient of the Queen Elizabeth II Platinum Jubilee Medal

Commonwealth honours

His Majesty's Most Honourable Privy Council (PC) :
 The Prince of Wales : 2016 – : Privy Counsellor (PC)
 The Queen Consort : 2016 – : Privy Counsellor (PC)
Personal Aide-de-Camp (ADC) :
 The Duke of Kent : 19668 September 2022: Personal Aide-de-Camp to Her Majesty The Queen (ADC)
 Capt Mark Phillips : 1974 2022: Personal Aide-de-Camp to the Queen (ADC) (Retired)
 The Duke of York : 1 February 198413 January 2022: Personal Aide-de-Camp to Her Majesty The Queen (ADC)
 The Duke of Edinburgh : 1 August 20042022: Personal Aide-de-Camp to Her Majesty The Queen (ADC)
 Sir Tim Laurence : 1 August 20042022 : Personal Aide-de-Camp to the Queen (ADC)
 The Prince of Wales : 17 March 20132022: Personal Aide-de-Camp to Her Majesty The Queen (ADC)
 The Duke of Sussex : 13 October 201819 February 2021: Personal Aide-de-Camp to Her Majesty The Queen (ADC)

Australia 
 The King : 
8 September 2022 : Sovereign Head of the Order of Australia (14 March 1981  8 September 2022 : Knight of the Order of Australia (AK))

Brunei 
 The King :
 1996 - Member 1st Class of the Order of the Most Esteemed Family Order of Brunei
Duke and Duchess of Edinburgh  :
Silver and Gold Jubilee Medal of the Sultan of Brunei.

Canada 
Canadian honours are bestowed on members of the Canadian royal family, either ex officio to sovereign of Canadian honours by virtue of being monarch of Canada or being a relative and subject of the monarch of Canada.

 The King:
 8 September 2022: Sovereign of the Order of Canada
 8 September 2022: Sovereign of the Order of Military Merit
 8 September 2022: Sovereign of the Order of Merit of the Police Forces
 1982 Canadian Forces Decoration and three clasps (CD)
 20148 September 2022 Privy Councillor of the King's Privy Council for Canada (PC)
 20178 September 2022 Extraordinary Companion of the Order of Canada
 20228 September 2022 Extraordinary Commander of the Order of Military Merit (Canada)
 The Queen : 2023 Canadian Forces Decoration (CD)
 The Princess Royal : 1982 Canadian Forces Decoration and two clasps (CD)
 The Duke of York : 2001 Canadian Forces Decoration (CD)
 The Duke of Edinburgh: 29 October 2015 : Canadian Forces Decoration
 The Duke of Kent : Canadian Forces Decoration (CD)
 Prince Michael of Kent : Canadian Forces Decoration (CD)
 Princess Alexandra, The Honourable Lady Ogilvy : Canadian Forces Decoration (CD)
  :
 The King : 20012022 : Honorary Member of the Saskatchewan Order of Merit (SOM)
 The Duke of Edinburgh : 11 May 2005: Honorary Member of the Saskatchewan Order of Merit (SOM)

Ghana 
 The King : 1977 Officer - 2018 Honorary Companion of the Order of the Star of Ghana

New Zealand 
 The King : 8 September 2022 : Sovereign Head of the Queen's Service Order; (19832022 Extra Companion)
 The King : 8 September 2022 : Sovereign of the Order of New Zealand
 The King : 8 September 2022 : Sovereign of the New Zealand Order of Merit
 The Princess Royal : 1990: Extra Companion of the Queen's Service Order (QSO)

Papua New Guinea 
 The King : 2005 : Royal Chief Grand Companion of the Order of Logohu (GCL)
 The Queen : 3 November 2012 : Companion of the Order of the Star of Melanesia (CSM)
 The Princess Royal : 29 September 2005: Chief Grand Companion of the Order of Logohu (GCL)
Sir Tim Laurence : 2005 - Companion of the Order of the Star of Melanesia (CSM)

Solomon Islands 
 The Duke of Gloucester : 2008 : Star of the Solomon Islands (SSI)

Tonga 
 The Duke of Gloucester : 2008 -  Knight Grand Commander of the Order of the Crown of Tonga (current rank denomination = Knight Grand Cross)
 The Duchess of Gloucester : 2008 -  Dame Grand Commander of the Order of the Crown of Tonga (current rank denomination = Dame Grand Cross)

Tuvalu 
 The Prince of Wales: 30 October 2017: Tuvalu Order of Merit
 The Princess of Wales: 30 October 2017: Tuvalu Order of Merit

Europe

Austria
 Princess Anne, Princess Royal: Grand Decoration in Gold with Sash of the Order for Services to the Republic of Austria

Denmark
 The King: Knight of the Order of the Elephant

Finland
 The King: Grand Cross of the Order of the White Rose
 Princess Anne, Princess Royal: Grand Cross of the Order of the White Rose

France
 The King: Grand Cross of the Order of the Legion of Honour
 Commander of the Order of Agricultural Merit
 The Queen: Grand Cross of the Order of National Merit

Luxembourg
 The King: Grand Cross of the Order of the Oak Crown
 Princess Anne, Princess Royal: Grand Cross of the Order of the Oak Crown

Netherlands
 The King:
 Knight Grand Cross of the Order of Orange-Nassau
 Grand Cross of the Order of the Crown
 Recipient of the King Willem-Alexander Inauguration Medal
 The Queen Consort: Recipient of the King Willem-Alexander Inauguration Medal
 Princess Anne, Princess Royal: Grand Cross of the Order of the House of Orange
 Princess Alexandra, Honourable Lady Ogilvy: Grand Cross of the Order of the Crown

Norway
 The King: Grand Cross with Collar of the Order of Saint Olav
 Prince Andrew, Duke of York: Grand Cross of the Order of Saint Olav
 Prince Richard, Duke of Gloucester: Grand Cross of the Order of Saint Olav
 Prince Edward, Duke of Kent: Grand Cross of the Order of Saint Olav

Poland
 Prince Edward, Duke of Kent: Grand Cross of the Order of Merit of the Republic of Poland

Portugal
 The King: Grand Cross of the Order of Aviz

Romania
 The King: Grand Cross of the Order of the Star of Romania

Russia
 Prince Michael of Kent : Member of the Decoration of Friendship (returned)

Spain
 The King: Knight Grand Cross of the Order of Charles III
 Prince Harry, Duke of Sussex: Commander by Number of the Order of Isabella the Catholic
 Prince Andrew, Duke of York: Commander by Number of the Order of Isabella the Catholic
 Princess Anne, Princess Royal: Commander by Number of the Order of Isabella the Catholic

Sweden
The King: Knight of the Royal Order of the Seraphim
 Prince Richard, Duke of Gloucester: Commander Grand Cross of the Royal Order of the Polar Star
 Prince Edward, Duke of Kent: Honorary Knight of the Royal Order of Charles XIII

Yugoslavia
 Princess Anne, Princess Royal: Grand Cross of the Order of the Yugoslav Flag

Africa

Egyptian Republic
 The King: Grand Cordon of the Order of the Republic

Liberia
 Prince Edward, Duke of Kent: Grand Cross of the Order of the Star of Africa

Madagascar
 Anne, Princess Royal: Grand Cross 2nd Class of the National Order of Madagascar

Asia

Bahrain
 The King: Collar 1st Class of the Order of Sheikh Isa bin Salman Al Khalifa

Iranian Imperial Family
 Princess Anne, Princess Royal: Recipient of the Commemorative Medal of the 2,500 year Celebration of the Persian Empire

Japan
 The King: Grand Cordon of the Order of the Chrysanthemum
 Princess Anne, Princess Royal: Grand Cordon, Paulownia of the Order of the Precious Crown

Jordan
 Prince Edward, Duke of Kent: Grand Cordon of the Supreme Order of the Renaissance

Kuwait
 The King: Member 1st Class of the Order of Mubarak the Great

Nepalese Royal Family
 The King: 
 Member of the Royal Order of Birendra
 Member of the Royal Order of Ojaswi Rajanya
 Recipient of the King Birendra Coronation Medal
 Prince Edward, Duke of Kent: Member 1st Class of the Royal Order of the Three Divine Powers
 Prince Richard, Duke of Gloucester:
 Member 1st Class of the Royal Order of the Three Divine Powers
 Recipient of the King Birendra Coronation Medal
 Birgitte, Duchess of Gloucester: Recipient of the King Birendra Coronation Medal

Qatar
 The King: Collar of the Order of Merit

Saudi Arabia
 The King: Member 1st Class of the Order of Abdulaziz Al Saud

Thailand
 Princess Alexandra, The Honourable Lady Ogilvy: Dame Grand Cross of the Order of Chula Chom Klao

United Arab Emirates
 Prince Andrew, Duke of York: Knight with Collar of the Order of the Federation

North America

Mexico
 The King: Sash of Special Category of the Order of the Aztec Eagle
 The Queen Consort: Sash of the Order of the Aztec Eagle
 Prince Andrew, Duke of York: Sash of the Order of the Aztec Eagle
 Sophie, Duchess of Edinburgh: Sash of the Order of the Aztec Eagle
 Prince Richard, Duke of Gloucester: Sash (1973-2015); Sash of Special Category of the Order of the Aztec Eagle
 Birgitte, Duchess of Gloucester: Sash of the Order of the Aztec Eagle

South America

Brazil
 The King: Grand Cross of the Order of the Southern Cross

Chile
 Anne, Princess Royal: Grand Cross of the Order of Merit

Colombia
 The King: Grand Cross Extraordinary of the Order of Boyaca

Peru
 Prince Michael of Kent: Grand Cross of the Order of the Sun of Peru

See also 
List of titles and honours of Queen Elizabeth II
List of titles and honours of Prince Philip, Duke of Edinburgh
List of titles and honours of Charles III

References and sources 

Orders, decorations, and medals of the United Kingdom
British
British royal family
Honours of the British Royal Family